18 Sagittarii is a single star in zodiac constellation of Sagittarius, located around 550 light years away from the Sun based on parallax. It is visible to the naked eye as a faint, orange-hued star with an apparent visual magnitude of 5.58. This object is moving closer to the Earth with a heliocentric radial velocity of −19 km/s.

This is an aging giant star with a stellar classification of K0 III, which indicates it has exhausted the hydrogen at its core and evolved away from the main sequence. It has expanded to about 9 times the Sun's radius and is radiating 309 times the Sun's luminosity from its enlarged photosphere at an effective temperature of 4,341. There is a much lower abundance of iron in the spectrum compared to the Sun.

References

K-type giants
Sagittarius (constellation)
Durchmusterung objects
Sagittarii, 18
169233
090260
6888